Suleyman Ansari, professionally known as the Arabian Knight and Q-Base, is a hip hop producer affiliated with the Wu-Tang Clan. He has produced tracks for GZA, Royal Fam, Killah Priest, Krumb Snatcha, Inspectah Deck, Afu-Ra, Craig G, Kreators, and DJ Deadeye. His most successful project was GZA's third solo studio album, Beneath the Surface, in which Ansari produced 5 songs and also served as co-executive producer.

Production discography

References

External links 

Living people
Wu-Tang Clan affiliates
American hip hop record producers
Mixing engineers
Year of birth missing (living people)